Minuscule 197 (in the Gregory-Aland numbering), A132 (Soden), is a Greek minuscule manuscript of the New Testament, on parchment. Palaeographically it has been assigned to the 11th century. The manuscript is lacunose. It has marginalia.

Description 

The codex contains the text of the Gospel of Matthew 24:3-28:20, Gospel of Mark and Epistle of James 2:10-4:15, with a commentary, on 154 parchment leaves (size ). The text is written in one column per page, in 23 lines per page, in brown ink, the capital letters in red.

There is also a division according to the Ammonian Sections, with references to the Eusebian Canons (written below Ammonian Section numbers).

Text 

The Greek text of the codex is a representative of the Byzantine text-type. Aland placed it in Category V.

History 

The manuscript was examined by Bandini, Birch, Scholz, and Burgon. C. R. Gregory saw it in 1886.

It is currently housed at the Laurentian Library (Plutei. VIII. 14), at Florence.

See also 
 List of New Testament minuscules
 Biblical manuscript
 Textual criticism

References

Further reading 

 

Greek New Testament minuscules
11th-century biblical manuscripts